Timothy E. McPherson Jr (Chief Semako I) is a descendant of the Nanny Town Maroons (Windward Maroons) and he is the chairman for the Economic Community of States, Nations, Territories and Realms of the African Diaspora Sixth Region (ECO-6) and he is also the founding governor of the Central Solar Reserve Bank of Accompong, which he created during his tenor as the minister of Finance for the Accompong Maroons (Leeward Maroons). He is Chairman of the Door of Return initiative, which is being spearheaded across Africa in cooperation with Ghana and Nigeria as part of the United Nations' (UN) International Decade for People of African Descent. During the 2018 Door of Return celebration in Nigeria, McPherson was officially honoured by the Akran of Badagry Kingdom and conferred with the Royal Chieftaincy title as "Yenwa of Badagry Kingdom".

McPherson was instrumental in negotiating the decision to establish an African Union Diaspora headquarters within the Maroon territories on the island of Jamaica. The headquarters will be used as a strategic gathering point for the Sixth Region, which was being consolidated by the African Union Permanent Mission to Washington and now by ECO-6.

In 2008, the Nanny Town Maroons were included within the UNESCO Representative List of the Intangible Cultural Heritage of Humanity, which obliges the safeguarding of the local ecology. McPherson has since become notable for his promotion of sustainable development and climate change related cooperation between Africa and the Caribbean. His appointment within the Maroon Council reflects increased collaboration among the Maroon communities on the island of Jamaica as they seek to protect their ancestral lands from commercial bauxite mining and the effects of global climate change.

While Minister of Finance, McPherson had made numerous strategic strides in restructuring the economy, and became particularly notable for the creation and introduction of the LUMI, the official currency of the economic community of the African Diaspora Sixth Region (ECO-6) as well as for the indigenous kingdoms on the continent of Africa. The LUMI is a non-fiat central bank issued currency that is underwritten with renewable energy and gold.

McPherson was born in Canada and has a background in economics.

References

Year of birth missing (living people)
Living people
People of Jamaican Maroon descent
Jamaican economists